1st National Board of Review Awards
1929
The 1st National Board of Review Awards were announced in 1929.

Top Ten Films 
Applause
Broadway
Bulldog Drummond
The Case of Lena Smith
Disraeli
Hallelujah!
The Letter
The Love Parade
Paris Bound
The Valiant

Top Foreign Films 
Arsenal
The Passion of Joan of Arc
October: Ten Days That Shook the World
Piccadilly
Homecoming

External links 
 National Board of Review of Motion Pictures :: Awards for 1929

1929
1929 film awards
1929 in American cinema